The 22nd Pau Grand Prix was a non-Championship motor race, run for Formula One cars, held on 23 April 1962 at Pau Circuit, the street circuit in Pau. The race was run over 100 laps of the circuit, and was won by Maurice Trintignant in a Lotus 18/21, run by the Rob Walker Racing Team.

Results

References

Pau Grand Prix
Pau Grand Prix
Pau Grand Prix
Pau Grand Prix